Marc Lafia (born  November 21, 1955) is an artist, filmmaker, photographer, curator, educator, essayist and information architect.

Lafia's career as an artist began in the early 1980s in filmmaking.  Lafia's many works include commissioned films, online works in Java and Flash, and multi-screen computational installations for the Walker Art Center; the Whitney Museum of American Art;  Tate Online: Intermedia Art;  Zentrum für Kunst und Medientechnologie (ZKM), Karlsruhe, Germany; NTT InterCommunication Center (ICC), Tokyo; and Centre Georges Pompidou.

Lafia's photographic works are speculative meditations on the new photographic conditions of the still image located in real and material exhibition galleries as well as in non-local emergent net galleries, such as Flickr.

Marc Lafia has lectured and taught courses on film directing, acting for the camera, new media art practices, and graduate seminars in new media philosophy, methods, and practices at Stanford University, San Francisco Art Institute, California Institute of the Arts, Pratt Institute of Design, and Art Center College of Design in Pasadena, California, New York Film Academy, and Columbia University.

Marc Lafia's essays on the topics of new media art, computational cinema, and the nature of the image have been published in Artforum International, Digital Creativity, Eyebeam.org, and Film and Philosophy Journal.

Marc Lafia is the Founder, Chief Information Architect and Creative and Editorial Strategist of Art+Culture.com, a net-based archive and exploratorium of contemporary art and culture, founded in 1998.  Lafia continues to curate and edit the award-winning Art+Culture.com site.

Museums of contemporary art, including the Museum of Modern Art-New York; the Tate Britain's online for-profit venture,  Tate Online: Intermedia Art; and the Institute of Contemporary Art, Boston utilized Lafia's expertise as a creative strategist and information architect to conduct global media audits of best practices in advance technologies for the arts, and audits of each institution's assets for online initiatives.

Marc Lafia resides in Brooklyn, New York.

Early career
Marc Lafia's early creative works were in the fields of 16mm filmmaking (1983–1994), advertising (1987–1989), screenwriting for feature films (1987–1993), and music videos (1989–1991).

From 1987 to 1993 while a member of the Writers Guild of America, Lafia tried his hand at writing screen adaptations, including the Marvel comic book Iron Man, and the comic strip Judge Dredd for Ed Pressman films.  Lafia also wrote an adaptation of Rudy Rucker’s novel Software, which won the Philip K. Dick Award in 1982. None of Lafia’s screen adaptations were made into films, but in the long path of development of a script into film, Judge Dredd, Iron Man, and Software all were eventually made into films by writer-director teams that worked subsequent to Lafia’s writing of the initial adaptations.

Lafia was the writer and conceptualist for Madonna’s Express Yourself (1989),
which won the MTV Best Female Video and Best Director awards.  Lafia was also a writer and conceptualist for Don Henley’s End of the Innocence (1990), winner of the MTV Best Male Performer award;
and for Michael Jackson’s Black or White (1991).

Films
Marc Lafia's film work parallels the migration of cinema art from beginnings in 16mm and 35mm film formats evolving through digital channels into multi-screen digital film installations and transmedia works exhibited variously in international museums, art centers and festivals, as well as across the Internet.

Vandemar Memex or Laura Croft Stripped Bare by her Assassins, Even (aka the ‘Memex Engine’) was an online Java and Flash multilinear interactive narrative first exhibited in 1999 in the group exhibition Net_Condition  at Zentrum für Kunst und Medientechnologie (ZKM), Karlsruhe, Germany.  The Net_Condition exhibition, curated by Peter Weibel and Timothy Druckrey, aimed to enlighten the viewer about ‘the different methods with which reality is constructed in various media’ by way of ‘a media project taking place primarily in the media space’ but also in the physical space of the ZKM.  Lafia states: “The Vandemar Memex is a rumination on the many fascinating tropes of extended self, distributed narrative, artificial life, collective intelligence and emergent systems.” The narrative construct of Lafia's Vandemar Memex was operated by the algorithmic structure of conditional statements whereby the viewer's input (selection of a code name and avatar) would determine which narrative plot sequence would be run out of a set of possible narrative plot sequences.  The set of possibilities within the ‘modulated plot structure’ of the Vandemar Memex still maintain a ‘dramatic arc: the diva is lost, a mystery is afoot, and the reader needs to face specific challenges to solve a specific riddle.’  As part of the Let’s Entertain traveling exhibition organized by The Walker Art Center during 2000–2001, the Vandemar Memex traveled to San Francisco MoMA; Miami Art Museum; Le Centre Georges Pompidou, Paris; Portland Art Museum, Oregon; and Museo Rufino Tamayo, Mexico City.  The Vandemar Memex was also exhibited in Cinema Online: Viewers as Creators, Rotterdam International Film Festival, The Netherlands; and in 2002, the Vandemar Memex was shown in Multilinear Narratives, Janco Dada Museum, Ein-Hod, Israel.

Ambient Machines was Marc Lafia's next online work in Java and Flash that was first exhibited at Open Source Lounge, Medi@terra Festival Athens, Greece in 2000.  Ambient Machines was a further development of Lafia's ideas about shared authorship, the locus of editorial control in film, and generativity of complex cinematic behavior from simple rules.  The viewer could interact with the Ambient Machines through the Ambient Player user interface.  Lafia gave the viewer creative control of their ambient experience via a menu of ambient music, from which can be selected Cage’s Etcetera, Eno’s Thursday Afternoon, Reich’s Music for 18 Musicians, Satie’s After the Rain, Stockhausen’s Aus den Sieben Tagen, and Thaemlitz’s Couture Cosmetique; plus a gallery of visual elements, image processing and navigational controls from which to construct ‘an infinite number of expressions.'  The viewer could also record, playback and save their creations for viewing later by other visitors to the Ambient Machines site. Ambient Machines was a finalist in the Art awards category of Flashforward, Flash Film Festival, New York in 2001.  Ambient Machines was exhibited in 2003 at Le-musee-divisioniste, Paris, France; Chiangma Media Arts festival, Thailand; and Machinsta, 2003, Russia Artificial Intelligence in Art, Machine as artist’s co-author.

In his many films, including the 35mm feature film Exploding Oedipus (2001), Confessions of an Image (2001), and Love & Art (2006), as well as various smaller-scale films, Lafia invites the viewer to reset their viewing benchmarks as they experience the viewing possibilities mediated by the digital conditions Lafia has created for the viewer.

Exploding Oedipus, a 35mm feature film, premiered in 2001 at the Seattle International Film Festival, New American Cinema.  The beauty and power of images that Lafia studies in his still photo works achieve narrative magnitude in his 84–minute feature film starring Bruce Ramsay as Hilbert, the young protagonist in search of his authentic self.  The function of images in the construction of the reality of self are explored by Hilbert when he isolates himself in a seedy hotel where he can review and analyze a montage of images from home movies, from recalled memories, and from his reflected experiences of his wanderings through San Francisco's artistic sub-cultures. Hilbert deconstructs these myriad images (and coheres and re-figures the images the viewer may assume) in a process of self-organizing creation.  Exploding Oedipus was also screened at the Mill Valley Film Festival, 2001; the San Francisco Gay and Lesbian Film Festival, 2002; the Los Angeles Gay and Lesbian Film Festival, 2002; and the Portland Gay and Lesbian Film Festival, 2002.

In 2002, Lafia began creating a series of multi-screen computational films, including Possibilities of a Beautiful Love (2002),Durations: Loops and Iterations (2002), Sing to Me and Tell Me Your Story (2002–2003), and Variable Montage (2002–2004).

Variable Montage was a 3-screen computational and algorithmic cinema installation created with Didi Fire and exhibited in the Distributive film category at Future Cinema – The Cinematic Imaginary After Film, a group exhibition curated by Jeffrey Shaw and Peter Weibel.  Variable Montage in the Future Cinema exhibition was on display during 2002–2003 at Zentrum für Kunst und Medientechnologie (ZKM), Karlsruhe, Germany, then at NTT InterCommunication Center (ICC), Tokyo during 2003–2004.  In Variable Montage, Lafia and Fire explored the migration of montage as a precise narrative grammatical device practiced by traditional cineastes to its infinitely variable form, when generated by computation, which becomes a montage that is more about construction than narration.  The computationally directed image could travel a trajectory of continuous iteration, from which an excess of possibilities could emerge from such continual play, possibilities for ‘surprise, coincidence, deformation, collision, [and] ambiguity.’ Variable Montage marks the first prominence of Lafia's conception of the ‘software as projector’ whereby the software functions ‘simultaneously [as] a playback and authoring machine’ in contrast to the reel-to-reel film projector that performs a single projection at a fixed frame rate.  Lafia writes in the text about Variable Montage that accompanied its exhibition in Future Cinema: “Variable Montage is as much an engine or structure for possible films as it is a film per se ... In computational imaging, time and sequence take on an entirely new sense, perhaps it is the difference of becoming rather than unfolding, where each time through the engine of computation a film becomes, revealing something essential about computation as an engine of possibility and something about cinema as a fixed machine of the particular.”

The Battle of Algiers (2004). Marc Lafia received a co-commission in 2004 from the Whitney Museum of American Art and the Tate Online to create a new work for ArtPort, the Whitney Museum's portal to net art.  That same year, Gillo Pontecorvo’s 1966 film, The Battle of Algiers, was released on DVD as part of the Criterion Collection. Lafia chose Pontecorvo’s The Battle of Algiers as his subject for his next multi-screen computational and algorithmic film because its ‘clear articulation of power’ fascinated him, and Lafia recognized its ‘dramaturgy suggested computational analysis.’ For Lafia and his collaborator, new media artist and designer Fang-Yu Lin, the problem they faced was how to set up a system containing a set of rules articulating the playback and creation of the multi-screen work that would ‘embody the action and philosophy behind the Algerian and the French interaction’ in Pontecorvo's The Battle of Algiers. The collaborators spent a fair amount of time working out how to re-figure Pontecorvo's film to realize it as a work that was ‘multi-spatial and happening iteratively in itself’ at different speeds, at different sizes, and in different places of the viewing plane. The viewer of the Lafia/Lin Battle of Algiers can, by hitting restart any number of times, set off the work on different trajectories, or the viewer can simply watch the work evolve on its own. Either way, by observing what is happening spatially in the work and in terms of durations, the viewer arrives at the eventual recognition of the modalities and tactics enacted by the opposing groups of the Algerian resistance fighters and the French occupation soldiers.  In the system Lafia and Lin created, their re-figuration of The Battle of Algiers becomes less about narration of the historic battle for Algerian independence that was ultimately won from the colonial French by a landslide vote on July 1, 1962, and more about modalities of power. Opening first at the Whitney in June 2004 and then in March 2006 at the  Tate Online: Intermedia Art, Marc Lafia's and Fang-Yu Lin's 744-hour computational film, The Battle of Algiers, is perhaps Lafia's best known and deepest investigation of systems for shared authorship (“who is the author of what?”), that distribute the locus of editorial control of a film (“where is the control?”), and generate complex cinematic behavior from simple rules.

Permutations are multi-screen films Lafia started in 2005 that he produced once a day with a Canon Xapshot digital camera over a period of several years that can be viewed at Lafia's Cinema Engine site.  In Permutations, Lafia continued to pursue his interest in ‘the instrumentation of playback in multiple screens and what could be articulated and continually re-articulated in the image-sound relationship through permutation’ as  ‘played and composed in a software environment created in MAS MSP.’ Influenced by the work of Raymond Queneau and Georges Perec, and Oulipo, the group Queneau and Perec formed in France in 1960 that investigated strategies for constrained writing for potential literature, Lafia explores in Permutations how sound inflects the image and what potential cinemas can emerge from the digital characteristic of an excess of organizational and narrative tropes.

Paradise (2009) further advances Lafia's investigations of the cinematic potentialities of digital excess and release from the constraints of classic film grammar. In his essay, Going with Marc Lafia’s ‘Paradise,’ Daniel Coffeen states that ‘Paradise oozes. It is a messy movie that moves, ceaselessly.’ It is also a ‘supremely erotic’ film without a single shot of nudity and just one simple kiss.  Rather, Lafia's 147-minutes of high definition moving images ‘deploy Eros’ through the cumulative effect of a film that joyously embraces flux and shapes chaos, using as its fulcrum a ‘profound reckoning with the very limits of the moving image.’  Paradise disarms the viewer of their expectations of conventional film narrative, inviting the viewer instead to ‘go with’ the flow of a film that is an open-structured happening, moving images in a state of becoming, and in that sense, exciting in the same way as there is excitement in viewing time-lapse high-magnification films of cell mitosis rapidly showing the process of a being becoming.

Photography 
Lafia's photographic practice embraces Timothy Druckrey’s challenge to advance the ‘reconceptualization of the formation, function, and reception of the image...’. The Event of the Imaging; The Image Remembered; American Flags; Still, an Image; and his recent project, F4, The Photography Desktop Collective are Lafia's notable advancements of the possibilities of imaging, whereby Lafia comments on the history of images contemporaneous to exploring the emergent conditions and characteristics of the beauty and power of imaging in new technologies of presentation and distribution.

Art+Culture.com 
Marc Lafia is the Founder, Chief Information Architect and Creative and Editorial Strategist of the website Art+Culture: How things go together, a 'complex contextual engine to the worlds of arts and culture.' Lafia designed the Art+Culture site to feature an algorithmic engine that can generate a cloud of connections between artists practicing in  Design Arts, Film, Literature, Music, Performing Arts, and Visual Arts with the result that the connections can reveal surprising, playful, interesting or inspiring relationships between artists, art disciplines, art movements, and cultural themes.  Thus, in much the same way as Lafia's algorithmic machines function to advance cinematic exploration and creation, a visitor or member of Art+Culture can explore and discover the worlds of art and culture.

Notable works 
 (1999) The Vandemar Memex for Walker Art Center
 (2001) 
 (2002–2004) Variable Montage  at ZKM
 (2004) The Battle of Algiers at the Whitney Museum of American Art and the  Tate Online: Intermedia Art
 (2005) Permutations
 (2009)

Notes

External links
 
 
 Metabolichouse (early works)
 Cinema Engine
 Marc Lafia's Photography on Flickr

1955 births
Living people
American experimental filmmakers
American video artists